The Cornish Islands are two small, snowcapped islands with a rock between them, lying  south of Liard Island in Hanusse Bay, Graham Land. They were mapped from air photos obtained by the Ronne Antarctic Research Expedition (1947–48) and the Falkland Islands and Dependencies Aerial Survey Expedition (1956–57). They were named by the UK Antarctic Place-Names Committee for Vaughan Cornish (1863–1948), an English geographer who made pioneer investigations of snow drift forms in the years 1901–14.

See also 
 List of Antarctic and sub-Antarctic islands

References 

Islands of Graham Land
Loubet Coast